Svechinsky (masculine), Svechinskaya (feminine), or Svechinskoye (neuter) may refer to:
Svechinsky District, a district of Kirov Oblast, Russia
Kristina Svechinskaya (b. 1989), former Russian money mule hacker